Phanteks is a Dutch company which mainly produces PC cases, fans and other case accessories. The company has a base in the United States.

History
Phanteks currently is known for their award winning PC cases.  Phanteks's first product was the PH-TC14PE, a CPU cooler, which gave the young company a good reputation right from the beginning. Later, Phanteks started its case product line, beginning with the Enthoo Series.

Nowadays Phanteks is among the leading key players concerning PC cases.

Current products
The company has several different versions of the Enthoo series and a few of the Eclipse series. Furthermore, their cases' cooling solutions have been extended by more CPU coolers, fans and accessories. Since the beginning of 2017, the company also produces liquid cooling blocks and fittings. One of their most recent computer cases, shown at Computex 2018, is the Evolv X. The Evolv X is the successor of the Evolv ATX; while similar to the original in design on the outside, the Evolv X has been redesigned from the inside out. It was chosen as one of the best products in its category by TechSpot and its editors. In partnership with Asetek they produced All In One Liquid Coolers.

See also
 Personal computer
 Computer hardware
 Computer cases
 Metallic Gear
 Antec
 Cooler Master
 Corsair
 EKWB
 Lian Li
 Thermaltake

References

Technology companies of the Netherlands
Computer enclosure companies